Stanisław Jan Klocek (born October 17, 1955) is a former Polish ice hockey player. He played for the Poland men's national ice hockey team at the 1980 Winter Olympics in Lake Placid, and the 1984 Winter Olympics in Sarajevo.

References

1955 births
Living people
Ice hockey players at the 1980 Winter Olympics
Ice hockey players at the 1984 Winter Olympics
Olympic ice hockey players of Poland
People from Nowy Targ
Polish ice hockey centres
Sportspeople from Lesser Poland Voivodeship